Allen Nathan Guy (born 1970) is a New Zealand former politician of the National Party. He was elected to Parliament in 2005 as a list MP and represented the electorate of Ōtaki after the 2008 election. He served as Minister of Immigration from 2011 to 2013. Guy did not seek re-election at the 2020 election.

Background
Guy is a farmer from near Levin. He has been involved in various agricultural sector trusts and councils, and studied farming at Massey University. He served eight years on the Horowhenua District Council from 1998 to 2005.

Guy's father, grandfather, and great-great-grandfather all had political careers. Guy's great-great-grandfather, Duncan Guy, was a member of the Napier Borough Council; his grandfather (also named Duncan Guy) was chairman of the Horowhenua County Council; his father, Malcolm Guy, also served as chairman of the Horowhenua County Council and was the first mayor of the Horowhenua District from 1989 to 1995. His maternal great-grandfather, Fred Nathan, was Mayor of Palmerston North from 1923–1927.

Guy's great-grandfather was chairman of the Wellington and Manawatu Railway Company when the last spike was driven on the company's line at Otaihanga, an event re-created on 19 February 2011 when Guy drove the last spike at the new Waikanae Railway Station opening ceremony.

Member of Parliament

In the 2005 election, Guy was a candidate for the National Party, standing in the Ōtaki electorate and being ranked 39th on the party list. He narrowly lost the election to Labour's Darren Hughes, by a margin of 1.00% or 382 votes but entered Parliament as a list MP.

In the 2008 election he was again the candidate for Ōtaki, this time defeating Hughes by 1,354 votes. He increased his majority to 5,231 votes at the 2011 general election, and again at the 2014 general election to 7,782.

Opposition, 2005–2008 
Guy's first three years in Parliament were in Opposition. He was a member of the Primary Production select committee for much of this term, and was a member of the Privileges and Standing Orders committees for about seven months until the 2008 election. When John Key became National leader in 2006, Guy became the party's junior whip and an associate spokesperson for agriculture.

Fifth National Government, 2008–2017
Guy was promoted to senior whip in November 2008 when National formed a new government. On 15 June 2009 he was selected as the new Minister of Internal Affairs, a position outside of the Cabinet, to replace Richard Worth after the latter resigned following allegations of sexual harassment.

On 14 December 2011, following the 2011 New Zealand general election, Guy was sworn in as the Minister of Immigration, Minister for Racing, Minister for Veterans' Affairs and Associate Minister for Primary Industries. Later that term, in January 2013, he was promoted to the role of Minister for Primary Industries. He held this position until the National government was defeated in 2017.

As Minister of Internal Affairs Guy was involved in the controversy that occurred in 2017 when it was revealed that, in 2011, he had granted New Zealand citizenship to US billionaire Peter Thiel after only 12 days residence (split over 4 trips in 5 years) in New Zealand. The normal residency requirement for a permanent resident to gain citizenship is 1350 days over 5 years. Thiel was granted citizenship by Guy under “exceptional circumstances” despite Thiel not having lived in the country previously and not intending to do so in the future. Thiel is the first adult to be granted New Zealand citizenship without meeting residency requirements.

Opposition, 2017–2020
After the National Party was not returned to government at the 2017 general election, Guy was initially the party's spokesperson for primary industries. From March 2018 until his announcement on 30 July 2019 that he would not seek re-election in 2020, he was the spokesman for agriculture, biosecurity and food safety.

Political views
Guy typically voted conservatively on social policy. He opposed same-sex marriage in 2005, by voting for the Marriage (Gender Clarification) Amendment Bill, which would have amended the Marriage Act to define marriage as only between a man and a woman, and in 2014, by voting against the Marriage (Definition of Marriage) Amendment Bill, a bill allowing same-sex couples to marry in New Zealand.

Guy also opposed the End of Life Choice Bill in 2019, which regulated assisted suicide in New Zealand, and the Abortion Legislation Bill in 2020, which decriminalised abortion.

Post-parliamentary career 
In November 2020, Guy contested but failed to win a seat on the board of New Zealand dairy co-operative Fonterra.

References

External links
Nathan Guy MP official site
Profile at National party

|-

|-

|-

|-

|-

1970 births
Living people
Local politicians in New Zealand
New Zealand National Party MPs
People from Levin, New Zealand
New Zealand farmers
New Zealand list MPs
Members of the New Zealand House of Representatives
New Zealand MPs for North Island electorates
Government ministers of New Zealand
Members of the Cabinet of New Zealand
21st-century New Zealand politicians
Candidates in the 2017 New Zealand general election